Charlotte Cords was a cargo ship that was built in 1923 by Neptun AG, Rostock for German owners. She was seized by the Allies in Travemünde in May 1945, passed to the Ministry of War Transport (MoWT) and renamed Empire Connah. In 1946, she was allocated to the Soviet Government and renamed Nikolai Bauman (Николай Бауман). The ship was scuttled while carrying a cargo of nuclear waste in 1964.

Description
The ship was built in 1923 by Neptun AG, Rostock.

The ship had a GRT of 1,779 and a NRT of 1,049.

The engine was built by Neptun.

History
Charlotte Cords was built for Dampfschiff Gesellschaft August Cords GmbH, Rostock. Her port of registry was Rostock and the Code Letters MFLN were allocated. On 25 July 1934, she was involved in a collision with the British cargo ship  in the North Sea off Grimsby, Lincolnshire, United Kingdom. In 1934, her Code letters were changed to DMAE.

Charlotte Cords was seized by the Allies in May 1945 at Travemünde. She was passed to the MoWT and renamed Empire Connah. Her port of registry was changed to London. The Code Letters GMZB and United Kingdom Official Number 180692 were allocated. In 1946, Empire Connah was allocated to the Soviet Government and was renamed Nikolai Bauman (Николай Бауман). She was operated by the Northern Sea Shipping Company (Северное Морское Пароходство), Archangelsk.

On 5 November 1957, Nikolai Bauman was involved in a collision with the Dutch coaster  just off the coast at Vlissingen Netherlands, which led to the latter ship sinking. All eleven crew were rescued from Corale and taken to Vlissingen to recover. Nikolai Bauman was on a voyage from Archangelsk to Rotterdam. Corale was on a voyage from Antwerp, Belgium to Wismar, East Germany . At the time of the collision, she was being escorted by the Vlissingen pilot boat. There was no chance for either ship to avoid the collision.

Nikolai Bauman anchored off Vlissingen following the collision. It was requested that she be held there until bail of ƒ1,750,000 was posted. Two officials tried to board Nikolai Bauman on 6 November, but Captain Pavel Mironiv refused to allow this, claiming that he was not responsible for the collision, and that it was a matter for the Soviet Government. He refused to be bound by any decision of the Dutch authorities and demanded access to the Soviet Embassy. It was not until that evening that negotiations were concluded and Nikolai Bauman was allowed to continue her voyage to Rotterdam after a much reduced bail had been posted. In 1961, Nikolai Bauman was transferred to the Murmansk Shipping Company (Му́рманское Морское Пароходство), Murmansk. She was scuttled in 1964 with a cargo of nuclear waste in Tsivolki Bay, Novaya Zemlya.

References

External links
Photo of Nikolai Bauman

1923 ships
Ships built in Rostock
Steamships of Germany
Merchant ships of Germany
Maritime incidents in 1934
World War II merchant ships of Germany
Ministry of War Transport ships
Empire ships
Steamships of the United Kingdom
Merchant ships of the United Kingdom
Steamships of the Soviet Union
Merchant ships of the Soviet Union
Maritime incidents in 1957
Soviet Union–United Kingdom relations
Germany–Soviet Union relations